Journal of Career Assessment is a peer-reviewed academic journal that publishes papers in the field of Psychology. The journal's editor is Ryan D. Duffy (University of Florida). It has been in publication since 1993 and is currently published by SAGE Publications.

Topics include:
 Career assessment strategies
 Developments in instrumentation
 Validation of theoretical constructs
 Relationships between existing instruments
 Career assessment procedures
 Relationships between assessment and career counseling/development
 Review articles of career assessment strategies and techniques

Abstracting and indexing 
Journal of Career Assessment is abstracted and indexed in, among other databases:  SCOPUS, and the Social Sciences Citation Index. According to the Journal Citation Reports, its 2017 impact factor is 1.626, ranking it 44 out of 82 journals in the category ‘Psychology, Applied’.

References

External links 
 

SAGE Publishing academic journals
English-language journals